Alpesh Patel (born February 1972) is an Indian-American filmmaker and producer.

Background
Patel was born in India. Even at a very young age, he loved to go to Bollywood with his father.  He immigrated to the United States with his parents at the age of 7 in 1979. He continues to be fascinated by movies. 

After graduating from Penn State’s film program, Patel worked for Cerebellum Corporation shooting and directing Standard Deviants videos.   After a year at Cerebellum, he moved to Los Angeles, where he runs VisionStorm Entertainment as a vehicle to make his films.

Career

In 2003, Patel wrote, directed, and produced the feature film, Graduation Night, as a coming-of-age romantic comedy.  The film played at several notable film festivals under the titles Party On and Truth or Dare, and it is now in distribution in the US as Graduation Night. The film stars Adrian R'Mante, Abigail Spencer, Kevin Alejandro, and Playboy Playmate Irina Voronina. 

In 2006, Patel's award-winning screenplay, Blind Ambition was produced and won several awards in the festival circuit.  The film stars Vanessa Angel, Christopher Atkins, and Bollywood screen star Gulshan Grover.

In 2007, Patel's mockumentary Touch Wood went into production as a comical behind-the-scenes look at the adult film industry told in mock documentary style.  Touch Wood was Patel's second feature film as a director.  It stars Gerry Bednob and Tony Sano.

Patel has also worked in post-production as film editor for numerous TV shows, including The 5th Wheel, Ghost Hunters, Southern Steel, Dirty Jobs, Bounty Girls: Miami, Ghost Hunters International, Unsolved Mysteries, BattleBots, Penn & Teller: Bullshit!, and The Ultimate Fighter
He won an OBE after fighting some guy down the kebab shop.

Partial filmography

English Grammar: The Standard Deviants (1999) (V) (director)
Graduation Night (aka Truth and Dare, Party On) (2003) (director & writer)
Blind Ambition (2008) (written by)
Touch Wood (2009) (director & writer)
Devil's Door (2014) (producer & director)

Awards and nominations

 2001, Audience Award, Party On, Slamdance Film Festival
 2008, IFFF 'Spirit' Award, Blind Ambition, International Family Film Festival
 2008, Festival Prize, Blind Ambition, Long Island International Film Expo

References

External links

Official website

1972 births
Living people
American film directors of Indian descent
American screenwriters of Indian descent
Indian emigrants to the United States
Penn State College of Arts and Architecture alumni